Grigoris Georgatos (born 31 October 1972) is a Greek former professional footballer who played as a left-back. His nickname was "the Crazy bald" due to his attitude on the pitch and his shaved hairstyle.

Club career

Early career
He began his career in 1991 at Panachaiki when his skills were first noticed in the Alpha Ethniki. After four and a half seasons in December 1995, he was transferred to Olympiacos. He came to the club playing as an attacking midfielder. He had to "fit" in the same line-up as Predrag Đorđević, so Dušan Bajević had he return to left-back. He gradually impressed with his performances lifting three consecutive championships with them from 1996 to 1997, when he finished as the side's top scorer despite his defensive role.

Internazionalle
In the 1998–1999 season, while playing in a UEFA Champions League match against Juventus, Georgatos caught the eye of Italian club Inter Milan, signing him in the 1999–2000 season for €7 million. He settled well in Serie A, playing 28 matches and scoring 2 goals for Inter. Despite that, the following season he returned to Olympiacos for a season-long loan, as he was sad and missed his family, house and Athens city. After his loan was over, he returned to the Serie A, with Georgatos choosing to rejoin Inter after losing his first-team place at the club from Piraeus. Although he returned to Inter, he could not get back into the first-team because of an injury that kept him out for a while, playing only 10 matches and scoring 1 goal that season. With his second spell in Italy being unsuccessful, Georgatos quickly returned to Greece.

Return to Greece
He asked to return to Olympiacos, but the red-whites refused as they had just signed Stylianos Venetidis who also played in the same position. Makis Psomiadis, took the opportunity and brought him to AEK Athens for €3 million, where he was called to work with Bajević again. Due to the presence of Michalis Kasapis in the team, Georgatos played in AEK in the position of the left midfielder. In the 2002–03 season he played 23 games as AEK finished third and also featured in four of the club's six UEFA Champions League matches. His great performances at the club gained the favour of the fans, who forgot his red and white past. The next season, he scored six goals in six games but was unsettled at AEK and in the January transfer window his third spell at Olympiacos began, helping them finish second. In 2006 Georgatos expressed his intention to end his career at Olympiacos when he signed a one-year contract until July 2007, retiring at the end of the season.

International career
He first appeared for Greece in a Euro 1996 qualifier against San Marino in September 1995. He prematurely retired from international football in September 2001, following a reported dispute with coach Otto Rehhagel. Georgatos played 35 times and scored 3 goals in total for Greece.

After football
After the end of his career, Georgatos initially enacted with the administration of Panachaki, while since 2013 he was one of the heads of the Olympiacos academies. From the summer of 2015 to the summer of 2016, he worked as the sports director of the Olympiacos with responsibility for the first team's competitive department.

Style of play
Georgatos was known as an offensive fullback with an excellent crossing ability; his combative style at left back earned him the nickname, "the Greek Roberto Carlos."

Career statistics

Club

International

Honours

Olympiacos
Super League Greece: 1996–97, 1997–98, 1998–99, 2000–01, 2004–05, 2005–06, 2006–07
Greek Cup: 1998–99, 2004–05, 2005–06

Individual
Greek Footballer of the Year: 1998–99
Olympiacos Golden Eleven

References

External links
Inter Archive 

1973 births
AEK Athens F.C. players
Association football central defenders
Association football fullbacks
Footballers from Piraeus
Greek expatriate footballers
Inter Milan players
Serie A players
Olympiacos F.C. players
Panachaiki F.C. players
Greece international footballers
Expatriate footballers in Italy
Living people
Super League Greece players
Football League (Greece) players
Greek expatriate sportspeople in Italy
Greek footballers